Tomás Paquete (8 September 1923 – 25 May 2009) was a Portuguese sprinter. He competed in the men's 100 metres at the 1952 Summer Olympics.

References

1923 births
2009 deaths
Sportspeople from Bissau
Athletes (track and field) at the 1952 Summer Olympics
Portuguese male sprinters
Olympic athletes of Portugal
S.L. Benfica athletes